Gonzalo Agustín Sández (born 16 January 2001) is an Argentine footballer currently playing as a left-back for Boca Juniors.

Career statistics

Club

Notes

Honours
Boca Juniors
Primera División: 2022
Copa de la Liga Profesional: 2022
Supercopa Argentina: 2022

References

2001 births
Living people
Argentine sportspeople of Paraguayan descent
Argentine footballers
Association football defenders
Argentine Primera División players
Boca Juniors footballers
Sportspeople from Lanús